Soltanabad-e Aran (also Romanized as Solţānābād-e Ārān; also known as Solţānābād and Sulţānābād) is a village in Saidabad Rural District, in the Central District of Savojbolagh County, Alborz Province, Iran. At the 2006 census, its population was 594, in 145 families.

References 

Populated places in Savojbolagh County